Millthorpe railway station is a heritage-listed railway station located on the Main Western line in Millthorpe, New South Wales, Australia.

History
The original station opened on 19 April 1877 as Spring Grove when the line was extended from Blayney to Orange. It was renamed Millthorpe on 29 February 1884. It was located 500 metres east of the present station which opened in 1886.

The disused station building was being used as the Millthorpe Wine Centre, a cellar door outlet for two local vineyards, in 2016.

After many years out of use, in October 2017 Transport for NSW announced planning was underway to reopen the station as a request stop for the Central West XPT service operating between Sydney and Dubbo. Amongst the work required was for the track to be realigned to once again run up against the platform. The station reopened on 15 March 2019.

Description 
The heritage-listed complex includes the type 2 brick station building, built in the sub-type 4 and the type 3 brick residence, both dating from 1886. The brick platform face and the station forecourt also fall within the heritage listing.

Services
Millthorpe railway station is served by NSW TrainLink's daily Central West XPT service operating between Sydney and Dubbo. As this station is a request stop, the train stops only if passengers booked to board/alight here.

Heritage listing 
Its location at the end of Pym Street closes the vista of the main street and gives it a prominence in the townscape of considerable significance. It is an important civic building in an historic town setting exhibiting fine proportion and detailing. Millthorpe station is one of four examples of this station type, the others being St Peters (1883), Riverstone (1887) and Spring Hill (1884) (demolished). It is the only intact surviving country example and is of high significance.

Millthorpe railway station was listed on the New South Wales State Heritage Register on 2 April 1999.

References

Attribution

External links

John Whitton railway stations
Railway stations in Australia opened in 1886
Regional railway stations in New South Wales
Articles incorporating text from the New South Wales State Heritage Register
New South Wales State Heritage Register
Main Western railway line, New South Wales
Millthorpe, New South Wales